Elamadu  is a village in Kollam district in the state of Kerala, India.

Demographics
 India census, Elamadu had a population of 26382 with 12571 males and 13811 females.

References

Villages in Kollam district